David James Luckes  (born 24 April 1969 in Newport, Monmouthshire) is a male former field hockey goalkeeper.

Hockey career
Luckes participated in three Summer Olympics for Great Britain: 1992, 1996 and 2000. He earned 125 caps for England and GB between 1989 and 2000. He represented England and won a bronze medal in the men's hockey, at the 1998 Commonwealth Games in Kuala Lumpur. Luckes played club hockey for Surbiton and East Grinstead.

Management
He also wrote the initial feasibility study for the UK 2012 Olympic bid and was in charge of Sport Competition for London Organising Committee. Formerly Director of Sport for International Hockey Federation in Switzerland, he is now associate director for Summer Olympic Sports and IF Relations at the International Olympic Committee. Luckes was raised in Bridgwater, Somerset.

References

External links
 
 
 

1969 births
Living people
People from Bridgwater
Sportspeople from Newport, Wales
English male field hockey players
Male field hockey goalkeepers
Olympic field hockey players of Great Britain
British male field hockey players
Field hockey players at the 1992 Summer Olympics
Field hockey players at the 1996 Summer Olympics
Field hockey players at the 2000 Summer Olympics
1998 Men's Hockey World Cup players
Members of the Order of the British Empire
Commonwealth Games bronze medallists for England
People educated at Millfield Preparatory School
Commonwealth Games medallists in field hockey
Surbiton Hockey Club players
East Grinstead Hockey Club players
Field hockey players at the 1998 Commonwealth Games
Medallists at the 1998 Commonwealth Games